Sigaus piliferus is a species of short-horned grasshopper in the family Acrididae. It is found in New Zealand.

References

External links

 

Catantopinae